Nimoka, stylized as , is a rechargeable contactless smart card ticketing system for public transport in Fukuoka Prefecture, Japan. Nishi-Nippon Railroad (Nishitetsu) introduced the system on May 18, 2008. Its name is an acronym of "nice money card", while  in Japanese means "also," as the card is usable also on buses, also on trains, also for shopping, etc. Like other electronic fare collection systems in Japan, the card uses FeliCa, RFID technology developed by Sony. On March 13, 2010, nimoca was interoperated with two similar cards in Fukuoka—SUGOCA from Kyūshū Railway Company (JR Kyūshū) and Hayakaken from Fukuoka City Transportation Bureau—plus Suica, a card used in Greater Tokyo Area by East Japan Railway Company (JR East).  The card features a ferret as the official mascot.

Usable area
As of March 2011
Buses: 
Nishitetsu Group: All local bus lines, and some highway bus lines.
Showa Bus: All local bus lines in Fukuoka Prefecture and some express bus lines.
Oita Bus: All local bus lines and some express bus lines.
Oita Kōtsū: All local bus lines and Airliner airport report bus lines.
Kamenoi Bus: All local bus lines.
Trains: All the lines.
Others (as electronic money): Solaria Plaza, Solaria Stage, Tenjin Core, Nishitetsu Store (those along Tenjin-Ōmuta Line), and others.

Future plans
Buses:
Showa Bus: All local bus lines in Saga Prefecture.
From 2013.

Types of cards
nimoca: Does not require registration.
Star nimoca: Requires registration. It can be reissued if a user loses it.
Credit nimoca: A credit card with the above functions.
These three cards can be issued either as prepaid cards or commuters passes.

Mejiron nimoca
See also: Mejiron nimoca

The  introduced the system on December 26, 2010 by Oita Bus, Oita Kōtsū and Kamenoi Bus in Oita Prefecture. The cute design combines nimoca mascot Ferret with Mejiron (めじろん?), the mascot character widely loved as Oita Prefecture's cheering squad.

Personalization
The Nimoca company provides a service where designers can upload images and have them printed on their custom IC cards. The minimum order is 500 cards where each card costs approximately ¥800.

Interoperation

The Nimoca card can be used anywhere Ic cards are accepted in Japan. As of July 2017 cards are accepted at all MOS Burger locations throughout Japan.

References

External links 
 Official website

Fare collection systems in Japan
Contactless smart cards
2008 introductions
2008 establishments in Japan